Victor Vinícius Coelho dos Santos (born 9 October 1993), commonly known as Vitinho, is a Brazilian footballer who plays as a striker and attacking midfielder for Saudi Pro League club Al-Ettifaq.

Club career

Botafogo
During the 2013 season, he scored 4 goals in 16 Campeonato Brasileiro Série A matches.

CSKA Moscow

On 2 September 2013, Vitinho signed a 5-year contract with Russian Premier League Champions CSKA Moscow. However, Vitinho struggled to be in the regular first team and instead, he made a handful appearances from the bench and often remained an unused substitute. Vitinho was linked with a loan move to Botafogo.

Internacional (loan)
On 16 January 2015 Vitinho joined Internacional on a one-year loan deal. The loan was extended until the end of 2016 on 24 December 2015. At the same time Vitinho extended his CSKA contract until the summer of 2020. CSKA had an option to recall him from loan in the summer of 2016, but they did not. At the end of his loan, CSKA announced they will not extend the loan and Vitinho will return to CSKA for the start of their camp in January 2017.

Flamengo

Following the 2018 Russian Super Cup game that CSKA won on 27 July 2018, the club announced that this was Vitinho's last game for them as they agreed on his transfer with Flamengo. Both clubs agreed in a €10 million transfer fee, so Vitinho became the highest transfer in Flamengo's history.

On 4 August 2018 Vitinho debuted for Flamengo in a league match against Grêmio at Arena do Grêmio, Flamengo lost 2–0. He scored his first goal for his new club on 5 September 2018 in a Brazilian Série A 2–1 loss to Internacional at Estádio Beira-Rio. He finished 2018 season with a total of 28 appearances and 3 goals for Flamengo.

Club statistics

Club

Honours

Club
Botafogo
Campeonato Carioca: 2013

CSKA
Russian Premier League: 2013–14
Russian Super Cup: 2014, 2018

Internacional
Campeonato Gaúcho: 2015, 2016

Flamengo
Copa Libertadores: 2019
Recopa Sudamericana: 2020
Campeonato Brasileiro Série A: 2019, 2020
Supercopa do Brasil: 2020, 2021
Campeonato Carioca: 2019, 2020, 2021
FIFA Club World Cup runner-up: 2019

References

External links

1993 births
Living people
Footballers from Rio de Janeiro (city)
Brazilian footballers
Association football forwards
Campeonato Brasileiro Série A players
Russian Premier League players
Saudi Professional League players
Botafogo de Futebol e Regatas players
PFC CSKA Moscow players
Sport Club Internacional players
CR Flamengo footballers
Ettifaq FC players
Brazilian expatriate footballers
Expatriate footballers in Russia
Expatriate footballers in Saudi Arabia
Brazilian expatriate sportspeople in Russia
Brazilian expatriate sportspeople in Saudi Arabia